Football competitions at the 2019 Pan American Games in Lima, Peru were held from July 25 (the day before the opening ceremony) to August 9. The venue for the competition was the Estadio Universidad San Marcos, which seats up to 32,000 spectators.

A total of eight men's and eight women's teams (each consisting up to 18 athletes) competed in each tournament. This means a total of 288 athletes competed. The men's competition was an under-22 level competition (born on or after January 1, 1997), with each team allowed up to three overage players. The women's tournament was an open competition without age restrictions.

Uruguay and Brazil were the defending men's and women's gold medalists, respectively; however, Brazil due a clash of dates with the 2019 FIFA Women's World Cup did not participate in the women's tournament to defend their title.

Medal summary

Medal table

Medalists

Participating nations
A total of 11 countries qualified football teams. The numbers in parenthesis represents the number of participants qualified.

Qualification
A total of eight men's teams and eight women's team will qualify to compete at the games in each tournament. The host nation (Peru) qualified in each tournament, along with seven other teams in each tournament according to various qualifying criteria.

Men

The top team at the 2018 CONCACAF U-20 Championship, from each of the Caribbean, Central American and North American unions qualified, the fourth spot was determined by CONCACAF at a later date.  
United States declined to participate, so Mexico qualified for the North American berth.

Women

The top team at the 2018 CONCACAF Women's Championship, from each of the    Caribbean,  Central American and North American unions, will qualify. The fourth spot was determined by CONCACAF at a later date.
Both Mexico and Costa Rica replaced the US and Canada who withdrew to focus on the 2019 FIFA Women's World Cup.

Men's competition

Group stage

Group A

Group B

Knockout stage

Women's competition

Group stage

Group A

Group B

Knockout stage

See also
Football at the 2020 Summer Olympics

References

External links
Results book

 
Football
Football
2019–20 in CONCACAF football
2019 in South American football
International association football competitions hosted by Peru
2019 in Peruvian football